Marsh Mill is an 18th-century tower windmill in Thornton, Lancashire, England. It was built in 1794 by Ralph Slater for local landowner Bold Hesketh. It functioned as a corn mill until the 1920s and has been fully restored. It is a good example of a complete English windmill and has been designated a Grade II* listed building.

History
Marsh Mill was commissioned by local landowner Bold Hesketh of Rossall Hall and built in 1794 by Fylde millwright Ralph Slater. Marsh Mill was named after the marshy area in the north Fylde that was drained by Hesketh for the mill's construction. Slater was a well-known millwright in the area; he also built mills at Pilling and Clifton. The mill was initially used to grind different grades of flour. From the early 19th century, it was used to grind meal for farm animal feed. In the 19th century, the original chain and wheel winding gear was replaced with a four bladed fantail. The original common sails were replaced with patent sails in 1896. The mill stopped working in the 1920s. From 1928 to 1935 Marsh Mill functioned as a café. In 1930, two women who intended to buy the mill fell and died while inspecting it when the fantail staging collapsed when they stood on it.

It was designated a Grade II* listed building on 24 March 1950. The Grade II* designation—the second highest of the three grades—is for "particularly important buildings of more than special interest". Beginning in 1965, a 20-year restoration took place by the Marsh Mill Preservation Society. Further restoration was completed in 1990, bringing the machinery to full working order. It has been described as the "best preserved" and "finest" windmill in the north-west of England. English Heritage have called it "an exceptionally complete example of a tower windmill in a national context".

Structure
The tower tapers and it has plain square windows. There is a two-storey kiln house attached. The ground floor and first floor are storage areas and have drying rooms. The second floor is the meal floor. It contains corn-dressing machinery. At the second floor, there is an external wooden stage that encircles the tower and is supported by stone corbels at the first floor level. This staging gives access to the sails.

The third floor is the stone floor, which contains four sets of millstones. The top floor is the dust floor. Like many Fylde windmills, the tower is topped with a boat-shaped wooden cap. It now has a "Lees Flyer" fantail.

See also

Listed buildings in Thornton-Cleveleys
List of windmills in Lancashire

References
Footnotes

Sources

External links

Buildings and structures in the Borough of Wyre
Grade II* listed buildings in Lancashire
Grade II* listed windmills
Windmills in Lancashire
The Fylde
Tower mills in the United Kingdom
Windmills completed in 1794
1794 establishments in England